The 56th Homeland Defense Infantry Division (Korean: 제56보병사단) is a military formation of the ROKA. The 56th division is subordinated to the Capital Defense Command and is headquartered in Goyang City, Gyeonggi Province. Its responsibility is the defense of Seoul and recruit training.

The division was created on 7 January 1984.

Organization 

 Headquarters:
Reconnaissance Battalion
Engineer Battalion
Mobile Battalion
Signal Battalion
Support Battalion
Military Police Battalion
Medical Battalion
Chemical Battalion
Headquarters Company
 218th Infantry Brigade
 219th Infantry Brigade
 220th Infantry Brigade
 221st Infantry Brigade

References 

InfDiv0056
InfDiv0056SK
Military units and formations established in 1984